Caleb Hunter Schlauderaff (born November 7, 1987) is a former American football guard and center. He was drafted  by the Green Bay Packers in the sixth round of the 2011 NFL Draft. He played college football at Utah.

Professional career

Green Bay Packers
Schlauderaff was selected by the Green Bay Packers in the 6th round (179th overall) of the 2011 NFL Draft.

New York Jets
The Packers traded Schlauderaff to the New York Jets on September 3, 2011 for an undisclosed draft pick. He was released on August 30, 2014.

References

External links
Utah Utes bio
New York Jets bio

1987 births
Living people
Players of American football from Washington (state)
American football offensive guards
Utah Utes football players
New York Jets players
Green Bay Packers players
People from Shelton, Washington